Jordan Kerr (born 26 October 1979, in Adelaide) is a retired Australian professional tennis player.

Kerr reached a career high ATP singles ranking of World No. 356, which he achieved on 7 August 2000. Additionally, he reached a career high ATP doubles ranking of World No. 23, achieved on 18 August 2008.

Kerr represented Australia in the men's doubles at the 2008 Beijing Olympics, losing in the opening round to the eventual silver medallists from Sweden.

Kerr was an Australian Institute of Sport scholarship holder.

2012

Kerr played for the Philadelphia Freedoms of World Team Tennis that summer. It was his first season playing for the WTT. The Freedoms competed in 14 matches this season, including seven home matches played at The Pavilion at Villanova University.

ATP Career Finals

Doubles: 15 (9 titles, 6 runner-ups)

ATP Challenger and ITF Futures finals

Singles: 1 (0–1)

Doubles: 61 (32–29)

Performance timelines

Doubles

Mixed doubles

References

External links
 
 
 

1979 births
Living people
Australian male tennis players
Olympic tennis players of Australia
Tennis players from Adelaide
Tennis players at the 2008 Summer Olympics
Australian Institute of Sport tennis players